Major (Retd) Tikendra Dal Dewan JP, is an ex- British Army Gurkha, a Gurkha leader/social worker/activist campaigning for equal rights of British Gurkhas. Dewan served in the British Army for thirty one years, United Kingdom Civil Services for eleven years and is the chairperson of the British Gurkha Welfare Society (BGWS) a welfare organisation for Gurkhas in the United Kingdom and Nepal and former CEO of Gnergy an energy company based in the UK run by retired British Gurkha veterans.

Career

Army stations 
Whilst in the British Army, Maj Dewan served in Hong Kong, Brunei, Cyprus, Belize, Nepal and United Kingdom.

Rank 
Dewan joined the British Army as a regular soldier and rose the rank of a Major, the highest for a Gurkha Officer and retired in 2002.

Post army 
After retiring from the British Armed forces, Dewan served in the British Civil services for eleven years before spearheading the energy company Gnergy as a CEO since 2013.

Activism and social work 
Dewan was instrumental in the Gurkhas campaign for equality in the United Kingdom when on May 21, 2009 all retired Gurkha soldiers were granted the right to live in Britain. According to Asia Times a critical speech of Dewan's resulted in public pressure that led to then Prime Minister Tony Blair finally relenting to the Gurkhas settlement rights in the UK.

Dewan was appointed a Governor in the Hampshire National Health Service (NHS) Council in December 2018 and Justice of Peace (JP): Magistrate for England and Wales, standing since January 2014 (North Hampshire Bench).

Gurkha Justice and campaigns 
Maj Dewan also heads the campaign for equal pensions for Ex-British Gurkha veterans. The legal and political campaign is over the fact that Gurkhas who retired before July 1, 1997, despite having won the right to settle in the UK with the assistance of Joanna Lumley's campaign, continue to receive much smaller pensions than their British counterparts. The pension inequality rule affects about 25,000 Gurkha veterans and the challenge was brought to court by BGWS on human rights and discrimination grounds. According to the UK Ministry of Defence (MOD) the ruling was "justified and proportionate" and not discriminatory on the grounds of age or nationality.

The UK MOD also argued the discrepancy is justified because of lower living costs in Nepal, although thousands of Gurkhas are UK residents.

The BGWS had taken the case to the European Court of Human Rights (ECHR) in Strasbourg, France which got rejected in 2016. Dewan and BGWS continue to fight for equality and justice for the retired Gurkhas.

BGWS 
BGWS is the first and the largest ex-Gurkha veterans organisation established in the UK to fight for Gurkha Justice and the welfare of ex-Gurkhas.

Achievements and awards 

 Gold Asian Achievers Award (UK), 2011 in community service, the first Nepali to receive this award.
 The OCU Commander's award for community relations in 2014.
Hampshire Constabulary Award in 2009
Don Allen Award Service to Education 2014
 The Nepali Media UK- One of the top ten Nepali personalities in the UK in 2013.
 CEO of the year 2013 for Hampshire by the CEO review magazine. 
First Nepali Justice of Peace (JP): Magistrate for England and Wales, standing since January 2014 (North Hampshire Bench)

See also 
Brigade of Gurkhas
Gurkha
British Army
Ministry of Defence (United Kingdom)
Khukuri
List of British Army regiments

References

External links 
 Witness History:  Tikendra Dewan, chairman of the British Gurkha Welfare Society. The Gurkha soldiers fight for equality
 BBC World News: looking at the proud tradition of the Gurkhas, and their campaign for equality
 BBC Witness History speaks to retired Major Tikendra Dal Dewan. The Gurkhas: We felt like second-class citizens
 Interview with Major Tikendra Dal Dewan from BGWS
 BBC: A Nepalese regiment of the British army won the right to settle in Britain in 2009
 विश्व लिम्बुको यक्ष प्रश्न, यूकेमा नेपालीहरुको समस्या के के छन् ? टिकेन्द्रदल देवानको जवाफ Tikendra Dal Dewan

Royal Gurkha Rifles soldiers
Royal Gurkha Rifles officers
British activists
British social reformers
British social workers
Nepalese activists
British chief executives
1953 births
Living people